Henry Capell, 1st Baron Capell of Tewkesbury KB, PC (1638 – 30 May 1696) was an English politician who sat in the House of Commons between 1660 and 1692. He was then created Baron Capell.

Early life
Henry Capell was born in Hadham Parva, Hertfordshire. He was the son of Arthur Capell, 1st Baron Capell of Hadham and Elizabeth Morrison. He was baptised on 6 March 1638. His father was raised to the peerage in 1641 and he died fighting for the King in the civil wars in 1649 as one of the commanders of the Colchester garrison. Henry's eldest brother was Arthur Capell, 1st Earl of Essex.

Career

Capel founded the Royal Botanic Gardens at Kew. Later Capel was elected Member of Parliament for Tewkesbury in the Convention Parliament. He was invested as a Knight of the Order of the Bath, on 23 April 1661. In 1661, he was re-elected MP for Tewkesbury in the Cavalier Parliament.  He was a member of the Irish Privy Council, from April 1673 to March 1684/85. Capell was re-elected MP for Tewkesbury in the two elections of 1679, was a member of the English Privy Council, from 22 April 1679 to 31 January 1680, and was First Lord of the Admiralty, between 1679 and 1680.

In 1689, Capell was elected MP for Cockermouth and was Lord of the Treasury, between 1689 and 1690. He was invested again as Privy Councillor, on 14 February 1689. He was elected MP for Tewkesbury in 1690, and sat until 11 April 1692, when he was ennobled as Baron Capell of Tewkesbury, in the County of Gloucester. One year later, he became Lord Justice of Ireland and in turn a Privy Councillor of Ireland, in June 1693. In 1695 and 1696, Capell was Lord Deputy of Ireland. His term as Lord Deputy was not considered successful because of him being a firm Whig and presiding over an administration which was deeply divided between Whigs and Tories, and he did nothing to help this situation change.

Capell died aged 58 in Chapelizod, County Dublin, and was buried on 8 September 1696 in Little Hadham, Hertfordshire. The barony died with him.

Private life
On 16 February 1659, Capell married Dorothy Bennet, daughter of Richard Bennet. The marriage was childless, but did bring part of what later became Kew Palace into the Capell family, leading to its becoming known as Capel House.

Dorothy died in 1721, and through her will endowed a number of charities.

References

Barons in the Peerage of England
Peers of England created by William III
Knights of the Bath
Lords of the Admiralty
Members of the Privy Council of England
Members of the Privy Council of Ireland
Younger sons of barons
1638 births
1696 deaths
Henry
English MPs 1660
English MPs 1661–1679
English MPs 1679
English MPs 1680–1681
English MPs 1681
English MPs 1689–1690
English MPs 1690–1695
People from Little Hadham
Lords Lieutenant of Ireland